The president of the National Assembly  is the presiding officer (speaker) of the National Assembly, Venezuela's unicameral legislature. The president's term coincides with the term of the legislature (five years as per constitutional convention). The post has existed since the election of the first National Assembly in 2000. Before the creation of the National Assembly with the adoption of the 1999 constitution, the country's legislature was the bicameral Congress, which contained the Senate and the Chamber of Deputies. The last president of the Senate was Luis Alfonso Dávila, and the last president of the Chamber of Deputies was Henrique Capriles Radonski.

Since 5 January 2019, Juan Guaidó, a member of the Popular Will (VP) party and the Democratic Unity Roundtable coalition, has been President of the National Assembly. On 5 January 2020, however, state police blocked some deputies' entry to the chambers of the National Assembly as Luis Parra was elected to be the next president of the Assembly, with Guaidó and his allies alleging the election took place without a quorum being present. However, José Noriega of the Popular Will party and second vice-president of the National Assembly stated that a sufficient number of votes were cast for a valid election. Following the disputed election, two competing claims emerged over the post – one by Luis Parra and one by Juan Guaidó, with both claiming to be the legitimate President of the National Assembly.

In 2020, parliamentary elections took place in Venezuela, in which, without opposition participation and amid claims for fraud and lack of transparency, Chavismo took full control of the legislature. Since January 5, 2021, the date on which the majority socialist parliament began sessions – the V Legislature, Jorge Rodríguez claims to be the president of the National Assembly, while the IV Legislature, elected in 2015 and recognized by a considerable part of the international community, extended its functions through a referendum, so Juan Guaidó also continues to maintain that he leads the Venezuelan parliament. By this situation, it is understood that two parliaments now operate in parallel in the country, one elected in 2015 with an opposition majority, and another elected in 2020 with a Chavista majority.

Constitutional role
The president of the National Assembly's authority resides in Article 194 of the Venezuelan constitution (section 2, chapter 1, Title V: "On the Organization of the National Public Authority"), which states the deputies are to elect a president and two vice-presidents from among themselves to administer and represent the National Assembly for a period of one year. Alongside the president and the two vice-presidents, the deputies also elect a -secretary and an under-secretary. The president of the National Assembly is second in the line of succession of the president of Venezuela after the vice president, as stated in Article 233 of the constitution.

List of presidents of the National Assembly

See also
National Assembly (Venezuela)
Venezuelan Chamber of Deputies, Lower house of Venezuela 1961-1999
Senate of Venezuela, Upper house of Venezuela 1961-1999
Speaker

References

External links
Official Website of the Venezuelan National Assembly

Politics of Venezuela
Venezuela
2000 establishments in Venezuela